Christian Enrique Cepeda (born 5 February 1991) is an Argentine professional footballer who plays as a defender for Cumbayá F.C. .

Career

Club
Cepeda had youth stints with Club Progreso Rowing and Arsenal de Sarandí. He failed to appear in Arsenal's first-team, though was an unused substitute in August 2011 for a Primera División fixture with Atlético de Rafaela. July 2012 saw Cepeda join Deportivo Merlo of Primera B Nacional on loan. Sixteen appearances followed as they were relegated to Primera B Metropolitana. Cepeda subsequently moved Torneo Argentino B on 30 June 2013 by agreeing to sign for Once Tigres. In June 2014, Cepeda joined UAI Urquiza. He remained for five seasons, featuring in one hundred and twenty-nine games whilst netting four.

Primera B Nacional side Guillermo Brown became Cepeda's fifth career club in 2018. He scored goals against Atlético de Rafaela and Villa Dálmine in his opening eleven fixtures for them.

International
Whilst with Arsenal de Sarandí, Cepeda received a call-up to the Argentina U20s.

Career statistics
.

References

External links

1991 births
Living people
People from Posadas, Misiones
Argentine footballers
Association football defenders
Primera Nacional players
Torneo Argentino B players
Primera B Metropolitana players
Arsenal de Sarandí footballers
Deportivo Merlo footballers
UAI Urquiza players
Guillermo Brown footballers
Sportspeople from Misiones Province